Pervomaysky District  is an administrative and municipal district (raion), one of the twenty-three in Tambov Oblast, Russia. It is located in the northwest of the oblast. Its administrative center is the urban locality (a work settlement) of Pervomaysky. Population: 29,277 (2010 Census);  The population of the administrative center accounts for 43.2% of the district's total population.

Geography
Pervomaysky District is on the northwestern border of Tambov Oblast, with Lipetsk Oblast to its west and Ryazan Oblast to the north.  It is about 75 km northwest of the city of Tambov, and 60 km northeast of Lipetsk.  The terrain is flat, with altitude above sea level between 130 and 160 meters.  Aside from agricultural land, the predominant vegetation is pine forest, with some birch and alder.

The district is about 40 km north–south and 30 km west–east.  The administrative center of the district is the city of Pervomaysky.  The M6 ("Caspian") highway that connects Moscow to the Caspian runs north-south across the middle of the district.  Subdivisions of the district include 10 urban and rural settlements.

As of January, 2016, the three largest towns are Pervomaysky (pop. 11,910), Khobotova (pop. 2,786), and Novospasskoye (pop. 2,733).   To the north, the area is bordered by Alexandro-Nevsky District of Ryazan Oblast, in the east by Staroyuryevsky District, in the south by Michurinsky District, and in the west by Chaplyginsky District of Lipetsk Oblast.

Climate
The climate is Humid continental climate, cool summer, (Dfb). This climate is characterized by large swings in temperature, both diurnally and seasonally, with mild summers and cold, snowy winters.

History
Significant settlement in Pervomaysky began in 1635, with the building of the Belgorod Line, and the expansion of the fort as Kozlov (now the town of Michurinsky, 20 km to the south).  The Belgorod Line of forts blocked the raids of the Tatars from the south.  Because Kozlov was the northernmost anchor point, the Pervomaysky district benefited from not only the construction and garrison activity, but also the safety.  Protected y the new fortifications, colonists moved into the area.

In 1866, the "Ryazan-Kozlov" line of the South East Railway was laid through the district, on which the Bogoyavlansk station was built.

Agriculture
Petrovsky is an agricultural district, both crops and livestock.  The primary crops are barley, sunflower and wheat.   Approximately 26,418 hectares (28%) of the total area of the district is in cultivation for crops.  Vegetables account for only 206 ha (less than 1%).  Livestock contributes about 20% of agricultural revenues, centered on dairy, poultry, and cattle.

In 2014, the top seven crops by area were:

Transportation
The Michurinsk-Gryazi line of the South Easter Railway crosses Pervomaysky District through the town of Pervomaysky, with station 'Bogoyavlensk'.  Detailed route map of South East Railway (in Russian)  The European route E119 from Moscow to Tambov runs north-south across the middle of the district.  The Urengoy–Pomary–Uzhgorod pipeline also runs through Pervomaysky.

References

Sources

External links
 Official map of the district
 Pervomaysky District on OpenStreetMap.org
 Pervomaysky District on GoogleMaps

Districts of Tambov Oblast